Kgomotso Itlhabanyeng (born 5 June 1989) is a South African netball player. She plays in the positions of C, WA and WD. She has participated in the 2011 World Netball Series in Liverpool, UK.

References

 Kgomotso Itlhabanyeng player profile, Netball England website. Retrieved 2011-11-29.
 'Plenty of experience for FastNet tournament', Netball South Africa official site, 16 November 2011. Retrieved 2011-11-29.

South African netball players
1989 births
Living people
20th-century South African women
21st-century South African women